Herry is a commune in the Cher department in the Centre-Val de Loire region of France.

Geography
The river Vauvise forms most of the commune's western border and the Loire most of its eastern border. A nature reserve, the Val de Loire National Nature Reserve was created here in 1995, along  of the Loire valley.

Population

Sights
 The church of St. Loup, dating from the thirteenth century.
 The fifteenth-century château.
 An ancient abbey at Chalivoy.

See also
Communes of the Cher department

References

Communes of Cher (department)